The 2002–03 Stanford Cardinal men's basketball team represented Stanford University during the 2002–03 NCAA Division I men's basketball season.  The team finished second in the Pacific-10 Conference with a 14–4 conference record, 24–9 overall. The Cardinal competed in the 2003 NCAA Division I men's basketball tournament, losing to Connecticut in the Second round.

Roster

Schedule

|-
!colspan=9 style=| Regular season

|-
!colspan=12 style=| Pac-10 tournament

|-
!colspan=12 style=| NCAA tournament

Schedule Source:

Rankings

*AP does not release post-NCAA Tournament rankings

References

Stanford Cardinal men's basketball seasons
Stanford Cardinal
Stanford
Stanford Cardinal men's basketball
Stanford Cardinal men's basketball